Marcus Scaurus may refer to:
 Marcus Aemilius Scaurus (consul 115 BC)
 Marcus Aemilius Scaurus (praetor 56 BC)
 Marcus Aemilius Scaurus (son of Mucia)
 Marcus Aurelius Scaurus